The canton of Gimone-Arrats is an administrative division of the Gers department, southwestern France. It was created at the French canton reorganisation which came into effect in March 2015. Its seat is in Gimont.

It consists of the following communes:
 
Ardizas
Avensac
Bajonnette
Beaupuy
Catonvielle
Cologne
Encausse
Escornebœuf
Gimont
Giscaro
Homps
Labrihe
Mansempuy
Maravat
Maurens
Mauvezin
Monbrun
Monfort
Razengues
Roquelaure-Saint-Aubin
Saint-Antonin
Saint-Brès
Saint-Cricq
Sainte-Anne
Sainte-Gemme
Sainte-Marie
Saint-Georges
Saint-Germier
Saint-Orens
Saint-Sauvy
Sarrant
Sérempuy
Sirac
Solomiac
Thoux
Touget

References

Cantons of Gers